Kalpana Saxena is a senior officer with the Indian Police Service. She is from the IPS class of 1990, and currently holds the rank of Deputy Commissioner.

On 3 September 2010 Saxena was dragged by subordinates Ravinder "Tiger" Kumar, Manoj "Sultan" Singh, and Ravendra "Nakatiya" Singh by her collar for over a mile from the back of a moving car in full public view in the city of Bareilly. The officers, with the help of an accomplice named Dharmendra, later tried to kill Saxena by running the car over her. The three officers were notorious for their misconduct; indeed, they were known as "The Criminal Police", and had previously been suspended multiple times, only to be reinstated with help from influential senior officers. Saxena, though injured, managed to escape and reached the nearby highway while the four of them escaped.

In 2013, Kalpana Saxena, superintendent of police investigated the Riots and Gangrape cases in Muzaffarnagar district.

In 2017, Kalpana Saxena, Superintendent of Police (Regional Intelligence) of Meerut Kalpana Saxena was made the commandant of 49th battalion of Provincial Armed Constabulary in Gautam Buddhanagar. In 2019 Superintendent of police Kalpana Saxena, serving as the commandant 49th battalion, was commanding the security of the Delhi Metro Aqua Line. Now she is tranffered in 47BN PAC gaziabad as commandent.

In 2021, Kalpana Saxena replaced Yogesh Singh as the commandant of 47 battalion of PAC, Ghaziabad.

References

Living people
Indian police officers
Indian women police officers
Year of birth missing (living people)